Gomelskaya Pravda is a Russian-language newspaper published in Belarus.

Russian-language newspapers published in Belarus